The Loubat Prize was a pair of prizes awarded by Columbia University every five years between 1898 and 1958 for the best social science works in the English language about North America.

The awards were established and endowed by Joseph Florimond, Duc de Loubat in 1893. The awards were given "in recognition of the best works printed in the English language on the history, geography, archaeology, ethnology, philology, or numismatics of North America."

Note that Loubat Prizes were also awarded to acknowledge outstanding social science works about North America in a number of European countries from e.g. The Royal Swedish Academy of Letters, History and Antiquities and the Royal Prussian Academy of Sciences.

See also

 List of social sciences awards

References
  "Among The Colleges ... Columbia." "New York Tribune" "December 30, 1895: 13 ("Two prizes, one of not less than $1000 and the other of not less than $400, will be awarded in 1898 to the authors of the best works on the history, geography, archeology, ethnology, philology or numismatics of North America. They are to be known as the Loubat Prizes, ..."). 
  "Awarded Loubat Prize - Dr. John R. Swanton Honored for Books on Indians." Evening Star (Washington, D.C.) May 11, 1913: 15 ("The prize, which carries with it $400, was founded in 1893 by the Duc de Loubat, formerly of New York City, but now a resident of Paris, to encourage researches in the history, geography, archeology, ethnology, philology or numismatics of North America.").  
  "Mr. Holmes' Honors. Washington Scientist Receives An Important Prize." "Evening Star (Washington, D.C.) June 10, 1898:10 (“The award of the Le Duc de Loubat prizes, founded by Columbia College of New York, to be awarded one in five years, for the most noteworthy works in American anthropology, has been made, and the first grand prize of $1000 was captured by Mr. William Henry Holmes of Washington, head curator of anthropology at the United States National Museum, and formerly curator of the department of ethnology in the Field Museum in Chicago.”).  
 "2 Awards Posthumous". New York Times 3 May 1953: 113.
 "Announce Loubat Prizes". New York Times 9 May 1918: 11.
 "He Is to Receive $1,000 of Columbia Loubat Prize". New York Times 27 May 1948: 26.
 "Literary Awards Made". New York Times 23 Sept. 1958: 30.
 "Loubat Prize Won by Dr. S. G. Morley". New York Times 20 Apr. 1943: 21.
 "March of Nations on Columbia Green". New York Times 7 Jun. 1923: 14.
 "Paullin and Wright Win Loubat Award". New York Times 11 Apr. 1933: 16.
 "Prof. S.E. Morison Wins Loubat Prize". New York Times 9 May 1938: 2.

Awards established in 1898
Awards disestablished in 1958
Social sciences awards
Awards and prizes of Columbia University
American awards
1913 establishments in New York (state)
1958 disestablishments in New York (state)